This Fragile Moment is a 2009 album by the British singer Toyah Willcox, recorded collaboratively under the name This Fragile Moment. The other musicians are Chris Wong of Toyah's other band The Humans, producer and touch guitarist Markus Reuter, and the Estonian duo Fragile: Arvo Urb (drums) and Robert Jürjendal (guitar).

The album comprises experimental songs derived largely from live-in-the-studio group improvisations. It was conceived and recorded in Tallinn, Estonia, within several days in June 2009. The album was released on the German label Unsung Records. Though the sleeve notes quote 2010, early copies were sold exclusively via Unsung Records' online store in November 2009.

Track listing
Source: 

 "Stones" (Pat Mastelotto, Markus Reuter) – 5:27
 "Break the Mould" (Reuter, Arvo Urb, Toyah Willcox, Chris Wong) – 5:08
 "Don't Even Try" (Reuter, Urb, Willcox, Wong) – 8:51
 "Run with Me" (Reuter, Urb, Willcox, Wong) – 5:18
 "Boredom Is a Killer" (Reuter, Urb, Willcox, Wong) – 6:07
 "Fragile" (Reuter, Urb, Willcox, Wong) – 4:40
 "Blow the Pain Away" (Reuter, Urb, Willcox, Wong) – 2:30
 "Born Broken" (Reuter, Urb, Willcox, Wong) – 4:50
 "In Estonia" (Willcox) – 5:06

Personnel
 Toyah Willcox – voice
 Robert Jürjendal – guitar (right channel), electronics
 Arvo Urb – drums, percussion, editing
 Chris Wong – bass guitar
 Markus Reuter – touch guitar (left channel), electronics, production

 This Fragile Moment – production
 Lee Fletcher – production assistance, mastering
 Indreko Anni – engineering
 Ritxi Ostáriz – art direction and design

References

2009 albums
Experimental music albums
Toyah Willcox albums